Chen Hsien-chung (born 1948) is a Taiwanese politician.

Chen attended primary and secondary school in Beigang, Yunlin and studied banking at Tamkang University.

A member of the Democratic Progressive Party, won election to the Legislative Yuan in 2004 as a representative of Yunlin County. Chen frequently criticized legislative gridlock, and, in January 2007, found himself in a physical altercation with fellow legislator Chen Chao-jung. Chen Hsien-chung was often involved in budget discussions, and was also known for his opposition to the use of ractopamine in pork products. Chen lost to Chang Chia-chun in the legislative elections of 2008.

References

1948 births
Living people
Tamkang University alumni
Democratic Progressive Party Members of the Legislative Yuan
Yunlin County Members of the Legislative Yuan
Members of the 6th Legislative Yuan